Kurtez (also: Kurtes) is a community in the Korçë County, southeastern Albania. At the 2015 local government reform it became part of the municipality Kolonjë.

History
The Kurtez ambush took place near the village in 1943.

References

Populated places in Kolonjë, Korçë
Villages in Korçë County